Chow Tai Ming (born 19 February 1959) is a Hong Kong former cyclist. He competed in the road race at the 1988 Summer Olympics.

References

1959 births
Living people
Hong Kong male cyclists
Olympic cyclists of Hong Kong
Cyclists at the 1988 Summer Olympics
Place of birth missing (living people)